Pierce is a Statutory Town in Weld County, Colorado, United States. The population was 834 at the 2010 census. The town is a rural agricultural community located on the Colorado Eastern Plains along U.S. Highway 85 north of Greeley.

History
A post office called Pierce has been in operation since 1903.  The town was named after John Pierce, a railroad official.

Geography
Pierce is located at  (40.635134, -104.754574).

Demographics

As of the census of 2000, there were 884 people, 312 households, and 249 families residing in the town. The racial makeup of the town was 86.99% White, 0.45% Native American, 0.79% Asian, 0.11% Pacific Islander, 9.73% from other races, and 1.92% from two or more races. Hispanic or Latino of any race were 20.48% of the population.

There were 312 households, out of which 39.4% had children under the age of 18 living with them, 62.8% were married couples living together, 11.5% had a female householder with no husband present, and 19.9% were non-families. 17.0% of all households were made up of individuals, and 4.8% had someone living alone who was 65 years of age or older. The average household size was 2.83 and the average family size was 3.15.

In the town, the population was spread out, with 30.4% under the age of 18, 7.7% from 18 to 24, 31.9% from 25 to 44, 19.0% from 45 to 64, and 11.0% who were 65 years of age or older. The median age was 35 years. For every 100 females, there were 102.3 males. For every 100 females age 18 and over, there were 99.7 males.

The median income for a household in the town was $36,944, and the median income for a family was $44,265. Males had a median income of $33,611 versus $22,174 for females. The per capita income for the town was $17,412. About 4.6% of families and 6.9% of the population were below the poverty line, including 9.0% of those under age 18 and 10.4% of those age 65 or over.

In popular culture
The opening scene of the 2000 science fiction film Titan A.E. takes place in Pierce, Colorado in the year 3028 A.D., right before Earth is destroyed by aliens. It is seen to have a futuristic spaceport.

See also

Outline of Colorado
Index of Colorado-related articles
State of Colorado
Colorado cities and towns
Colorado municipalities
Colorado counties
Weld County, Colorado
Colorado metropolitan areas
Front Range Urban Corridor
North Central Colorado Urban Area
Denver-Aurora-Boulder, CO Combined Statistical Area
Greeley, CO Metropolitan Statistical Area

References

External links
Town of Pierce contacts
CDOT map of the Town of Pierce

Towns in Weld County, Colorado
Towns in Colorado